Fernando Escartín Coti (born 24 January 1968) is a Spanish former road racing cyclist. Between 1995 and 2000 he came in the top 10 of the Tour de France five times and in that same time period finished on the podium in 2nd place at the Vuelta a España, twice.

Biography
Escartín was born in Biescas, Aragon.

Tour de France
Escartín won a stage and finished third overall in the 1999 Tour de France. Of the cyclists who finished on the podium in the era in which Lance Armstrong won the Tour de France seven times (1999–2005), Escartín is the sole rider not to be implicated in a doping scandal. In response to the Armstrong doping scandal, Escartin stated, "Lance Armstrong remains the 1999 Tour winner, second Zulle and third, me... It's 13 years now since this all happened. It seems completely illogical and unreal. I don't want to even think about it."

Escartín  was, however, one of the names involved with the Giardini Margherita Raid where prescriptions for banned substances were found, handwritten by sports doctors.

Retirement
Escartín rode his last race at a criterium in Llobregat on 4 November 2002, before retiring from professional cycling.

He has worked as a race co-designer for the Vuelta a España since retirement.

Career achievements

Major results

1993
 1st Gran Premio de Náquera
 1st Stage 5 Tour of Galicia
 2nd Trofeo Luis Ocaña
 3rd Overall Tour de Suisse
 3rd Road race, National Road Championships
 3rd Klasika Primavera
 9th Overall Critérium International
 10th Overall Vuelta a España
1994
 1st Clásica a los Puertos de Guadarrama
 2nd Overall Volta a Catalunya
 7th Subida al Naranco
 8th Overall Tour of the Basque Country
 9th Overall Vuelta a España
1995
 1st  Overall Vuelta a Aragón
1st Stage 3
 1st  Overall Vuelta a los Valles Mineros
1st Stage 1
 1st Clásica de Sabiñánigo
 2nd Subida al Naranco
 3rd Klasika Primavera
 6th Overall Tour of the Basque Country
 6th Overall Critérium International
 7th Overall Tour de France
 10th Overall Tour de Suisse
1996
 1st Clásica a los Puertos de Guadarrama
 2nd Overall Vuelta a Asturias
 3rd Road race, National Road Championships
 6th Overall Critérium du Dauphiné Libéré
 6th Overall Euskal Bizikleta
 7th Subida al Naranco
 8th Overall Tour de France
 10th Overall Vuelta a España
1997
 1st  Overall Volta a Catalunya
1st Stage 6
 2nd Overall Vuelta a España
 3rd Overall Vuelta a Asturias
1st Stage 2
 3rd Overall Vuelta a Burgos
 5th Overall Tour de France
 6th Overall Vuelta a Aragón
 9th Overall Escalada a Montjuïc
 10th Grand Prix Navarre
1998
 1st Stage 1 Vuelta a Aragón
 2nd Overall Vuelta a España
 3rd Overall Volta a Catalunya
1st Stage 8
 4th Overall Vuelta a Burgos
 5th Overall Vuelta a Castilla y León
 8th Overall Euskal Bizikleta
 9th Overall Vuelta a Asturias
1999
 3rd Overall Tour de France
1st Stage 15
 3rd Overall Vuelta a Asturias
1st Stages 4 & 5
 4th Overall Euskal Bizikleta
1st Stages 3 & 5
 7th Overall Volta a Catalunya
2000
 2nd Clásica a los Puertos de Guadarrama
 4th Overall Tour of Galicia
 7th Overall Vuelta a España
 10th Overall Vuelta a Burgos
 7th Overall Volta a Catalunya
 8th Overall Tour de France
 9th Overall Vuelta a Aragón
 10th Overall Euskal Bizikleta
2001
 3rd Overall Volta a Catalunya
 3rd Züri-Metzgete
 10th Overall Vuelta a España
2002
 4th GP Miguel Induráin
 5th Overall Volta a Catalunya
 8th Overall Giro d'Italia

Grand Tour general classification results timeline

DNF=Did not finish

References

External links 

Official Tour de France results for Fernando Escartín

1968 births
Living people
Spanish male cyclists
Spanish Tour de France stage winners
People from Alto Gállego
Sportspeople from the Province of Huesca
Cyclists from Aragon